Panama is a country located in Central America, bordering both the Caribbean Sea and the Pacific Ocean, between Colombia and Costa Rica. Panama is located on the narrow and low Isthmus of Panama.

This S-shaped isthmus is situated between 7° and 10° north latitude and 77° and 83° west longitude.

Geology

The geology of Panama is extremely complicated.  The land was formed by interactions of several tectonic plates over the past 10 million years.

Elevation

The dominant feature of Panama's landform is the central spine of mountains and hills that forms the continental divide. The divide does not form part of the great mountain chains of North America, and only near the Colombian border are there highlands related to the Andean system of South America. The spine that forms the divide is the highly eroded arch of an uplift from the sea bottom, in which peaks were formed by volcanic intrusions.

The western portion of the spine, the Cordillera Central, extends from Costa Rica to a low saddle near the Panama Canal. Within the Cordillera Central are three ranges. Volcán Barú (or Volcán de Chiriquí) last erupted in 1550 and is the apex of a highland that includes Panama's richest soil. Further east are the lower Serranía de Tabasará and Sierra de Veraguas ranges, the latter extending towards the Panama Canal.

Climate

Panama has a tropical climate. Temperatures are uniformly high—as is the relative humidity—and there is little seasonal variation. Diurnal ranges are low; on a typical dry-season day in the capital city, the early morning minimum may be  and the afternoon maximum . The temperature seldom exceeds  for more than a short time.

Temperatures on the Pacific side of the isthmus are somewhat lower than on the Caribbean, and breezes tend to rise after dusk in most parts of the country. Temperatures are markedly cooler in the higher parts of the mountain ranges, and frosts occur in the Cordillera de Talamanca in western Panama.

Almost all of the rain falls during the rainy season, which is usually from May through November, but varies in length from seven to nine months, with certain exception due to monsoons. The cycle of rainfall is determined primarily by two factors: moisture from the Caribbean, which is transported by north and northeast winds prevailing during most of the year, and the continental divide, which acts as a rain shield for the Pacific lowlands.

A third influence that is present during the late autumn is the southwest wind off the Pacific. This wind brings some precipitation to the Pacific lowlands, modified by the highlands of the Península de Azuero, which form a partial rainshield for much of central Panama. Rainfall is generally much heavier on the Caribbean than on the Pacific side. The annual average in Panama City is little more than half of that in Colón. Although rainy-season thunderstorms are common, the country is outside the hurricane belt.

Examples

Vegetation

Panama's tropical environment supports an abundance of plants. Forests dominate, interrupted in places by grasslands, scrub, and crops. Nearly 40 percent of Panama is wooded. Deforestation is a continuing threat to the rain-drenched woodlands. Tree cover has been reduced by more than 50 percent since the 1940s.

Subsistence farming, widely practiced from the northeastern jungles to the southwestern grasslands, consists largely of corn, bean, and tuber plots. Mangrove swamps occur along parts of both coasts, with banana plantations occupying deltas near Costa Rica. In many places, a multi-canopied rain forest abuts the swamp on one side of Panama and increases to the lower reaches of slopes in the other.

Harbors

The Caribbean coastline is marked by several good natural harbors. The numerous islands of the Archipiélago de Bocas del Toro, near the Beaches of Costa Rica, provide an extensive natural roadstead and shield the banana port of Almirante. The over 350 San Blas Islands, near Colombia, are strung out for more than  along the sheltered Caribbean coastline.

The major port on the Pacific coastline is Balboa. The principal islands are those of the Archipiélago de las Perlas in the middle of the Gulf of Panama, the penal colony on the Isla de Coiba in the Golfo de Chiriquí, and the decorative island of Taboga, a tourist attraction that can be seen from Panama City. In all, there are some 1,000 islands off the Pacific coast.

The Pacific coastal waters are extraordinarily shallow. As a consequence, the tidal range is extreme. A recent global remote sensing analysis suggested that there were 1,016 km2 of tidal flats in Panama, making it the 32nd ranked country in terms of tidal flat area.

Waterways
Nearly 500 rivers lace Panama's rugged landscape. Mostly unnavigable, many originate as swift highland streams, meander in valleys, and form coastal deltas. The Río Chepo and the Río Chagres are sources of hydroelectric power. The Kampia lake and Madden Lake (also filled with water from the Río Chagres) provide hydroelectricity for the area of the former Canal Zone.

More than 300 rivers empty into the Pacific. These Pacific-oriented rivers are longer and slower running than those of the Caribbean side. Their basins are also more extensive. One of the longest is the Río Tuira which flows into the Golfo de San Miguel and is the nation's only river navigable by larger vessels.

Administrative divisions

Panama is divided into 10 provinces, plus several indigenous comarcas. The provinces are divided into districts, which in turn are subdivided into sections called corregimientos. Configurations of the corregimientos are changed periodically to accommodate population changes as revealed in the census reports.

General facts

Geographic coordinates: 

Map references:
Northern South America, the Caribbean and sometimes Central America

Area:
total:
75,420 km2
land:
74,340 km2
water:
1,080 km2

Land boundaries:
total:
555 km
border countries:
Colombia 225 km, Costa Rica 330 km

Coastline:
2,490 km

Maritime claims:
territorial sea:

contiguous zone:

exclusive economic zone:

Climate:
tropical maritime; hot, humid, cloudy; prolonged rainy season (May to January), short dry season (January to May)

Terrain:
interior mostly steep, rugged mountains and dissected, upland plains; coastal areas largely plains and rolling hills

Extreme points:

Northernmost point: Point Manzanillo

Southernmost point: Punta Mariato, Cerro Hoya National Park, Veraguas

Westernmost point: Border with Costa Rica, Chiriquí Province

Easternmost point: Border with Colombia, Darién ProvinceLowest point: Pacific Ocean 0 mHighest point: Volcan de Chiriqui 3,475 m

Natural resources:
copper, mahogany forests, shrimp, hydropower

Land use:
arable land:
7.16%
permanent crops:
2.51%
other:
90.33% (2011)

Irrigated land:
346.2 km2 (2003)

Total renewable water resources:
148 km3 (2011)

Natural hazards:
occasional severe storms and forest fires in the Darien area, earthquakes

Environment - current issues:
water pollution from agricultural runoff threatens fishery resources; deforestation of tropical rain forest; land degradation and soil erosion threatens siltation of Panama Canal; air pollution in urban areas; mining threatens natural resources

Environment - international agreements:
party to:
Biodiversity, Climate Change, Climate Change-Kyoto Protocol, Desertification, Endangered Species, Environmental Modification, Hazardous Wastes, Law of the Sea, Marine Dumping, Ozone Layer Protection, Ship Pollution, Tropical Timber 83, Tropical Timber 94, Wetlands, Whaling
signed, but not ratified:
Marine Life Conservation

Geography - note:
strategic location at eastern end of Central America; controls Panama Canal that links Atlantic Ocean via Caribbean Sea with Pacific Ocean. Central Panama has the unusual distinction of having the sun rise over the Pacific and set over the Atlantic.

References